Graeme Forbes is the name of:

Graeme Forbes (philosopher), American philosopher
Graeme Forbes (footballer) (born 1958), Scottish footballer

See also
Graham Forbes, Scottish priest